The Plomosa Mountains are a mountain range in La Paz County, Arizona, running generally south of Bouse, Arizona near the Arizona/California border. Quartzsite lies to the west across the La Posa Plain. The Harcuvar Mountains and Little Harquahala Mountains lie to the east across the Ranegras Plain. The New Water Mountains lie to the southeast beyond Black Mesa.

Interstate 10 crosses the center of the range.  The Plomosa ghost town and mining camp lie on the southwest side of the range.

Evidence of both thrust faulting and strike-slip faulting is present in the Plomosa Mountains.

The highpoint of the range is Black Mesa (La Paz County) in the southern regions. Ibex Peak is a highpoint in the north.

References

Mountain ranges of the Sonoran Desert
Mountain ranges of the Lower Colorado River Valley
Mountain ranges of La Paz County, Arizona
Mountain ranges of Arizona